Bosun Ayeni (born 8 November 1978) is a retired Nigerian professional football midfielder.

On 2008-03-28 he was fired from SønderjyskE after headbutting teammate Kenneth Fabricius twice.

External links
Career statistics at Danmarks Radio
 Boldklubben Frem profile
 Player Profile

1978 births
Living people
Yoruba sportspeople
Sportspeople from Lagos
Nigerian footballers
Nigerian expatriate footballers
A.C. Reggiana 1919 players
Lyngby Boldklub players
Boldklubben Frem players
FC Nordsjælland players
AC Horsens players
Danish Superliga players
Liga I players
Shooting Stars S.C. players
Brønshøj Boldklub players
Association football midfielders
SønderjyskE Fodbold players
Nigerian expatriate sportspeople in Romania
Nigerian expatriate sportspeople in Italy
Nigerian expatriate sportspeople in Denmark
Expatriate footballers in Romania
Expatriate footballers in Italy
Expatriate men's footballers in Denmark